Vertical is an American film distribution and production company founded by producers Richard B. "Rich" Goldberg and Mitch Budin in 2012.

History
In 2012, Rich Goldberg & Mitch Budin founded Vertical, a film distribution company that releases films theatrically, through video on demand, and through home media. In May 2013, Vertical announced its plans to release 24 films per year, starting the same year. The company has collaborated with XYZ Films on films, including Holidays, Under the Shadow, and Headshot.

In November 2019, it was announced Vertical would launch a U.K. distribution arm.

Film library

References

External links
 

American companies established in 2012
Film distributors of the United States
Film distributors of the United Kingdom
Film production companies of the United States